Bilingual may refer to:
Bilingualism, the use of more than one natural language (for instance, English and German)
Bilingual (album), a Pet Shop Boys album
"Bilingual", a song by Ivy Queen and Remy Ma from the album There's Something About Remy: Based on a True Story
Bilingual Review, a scholarly and literary journal of Hispanic-American bilingualism and literature
Bilingual Review Press, a publishing house affiliated with the Hispanic Research Center at Arizona State University 
Bilingual inscription, in epigraphy an inscription that is extant in two languages

See also
 Bilingualism (disambiguation)
Bilingualism: Language and Cognition, an academic journal
Official bilingualism in Canada, the policy of Canada's federal government giving English and French privileged legal status
Bilingualism in Ottawa, the policy of the City of Ottawa, giving privileged status to English and French

Bilingualism